Vice Admiral Douglas Seaman Boyle CMM, CD (29 November 1923 – 23 July 2001) was a Canadian Forces officer who served as Commander of Maritime Command from 21 August 1973 to 14 June 1977.

Career
Boyle joined the Royal Canadian Navy in 1939 and trained at the Royal Naval College, Dartmouth before serving in the cruiser  and the destroyers ,  and HMCS Chaudiere during the Second World War. He became Commanding Officer of the destroyer  in 1957, Commanding Officer of the destroyer  in 1959 and Commander of the 4th Canadian Escort Squadron in 1962. He went on to be Director Naval Training at the National Defence Headquarters in 1964, Director Senior Appointments (Navy) in 1964 and Director General Postings & Careers in 1966. After that he became Commander NATO Standing Naval Force Atlantic in 1970, Director General Plans Requirements and Production in 1971 and Chief of Personnel for the Canadian Armed Forces in 1972. His last appointment was as Commander Maritime Command in 1973, in which role he complained about the gap between commitments and capability at Maritime Command, before retiring in 1977.

Awards and decorations
Boyle's personal awards and decorations include the following:

x32px

110px

100px

References

Canadian admirals
Royal Canadian Navy officers
Commanders of the Order of Military Merit (Canada)
1923 births
2001 deaths
Commanders of the Royal Canadian Navy
Canadian military personnel from British Columbia